Agarathirunallur is a village in the Kudavasal taluk of Tiruvarur district, Tamil Nadu, India.

Demographics 

As per the 2001 census, Agarathirunallur  had a total population of 1584 with 838 males and 746 females. The sex ratio was 890. The literacy rate was 62.02.

References 

 

Villages in Tiruvarur district